The 2018 FIFA World Cup qualification process was a series of tournaments organised by the six FIFA confederations to decide 31 of the 32 teams which would play in the 2018 FIFA World Cup, with Russia qualifying automatically as hosts. All 210 remaining FIFA member associations were eligible to enter the qualifying process, and for the first time in World Cup history, all eligible national teams registered for the preliminary competition, but Zimbabwe and Indonesia were disqualified before playing their first matches. Bhutan, South Sudan, Gibraltar and Kosovo made their FIFA World Cup qualification debuts, while Myanmar participated after successfully appealing against a ban from the competition, although the team was obliged to play its home matches outside the country.

While the main qualifying draw took place at the Konstantinovsky Palace in Strelna, Saint Petersburg, on 25 July 2015, qualification matches were played before that. The first, between Timor-Leste and Mongolia, began in Dili on 12 March 2015 as part of the AFC's qualification, with East Timorese player Chiquito do Carmo scoring the first goal in qualification. Matches were also played in CONCACAF prior to the main draw.

Qualified teams

Notes

Qualification process
The number of teams participating in the final tournament was 32. Even though the qualification process began in March 2015, the allocation of slots for each confederation was discussed by the FIFA Executive Committee on 30 May 2015 in Zürich after the FIFA Congress. It was decided that the same allocation as 2014 would be kept for the 2018 and 2022 tournaments.

Proposal for expansion
In October 2013, UEFA President Michel Platini proposed that the World Cup finals should be expanded from 32 to 40 teams starting from 2018. The format would have been the same, but in groups of five instead of four. This was in response to FIFA President Sepp Blatter's comments that Africa and Asia deserved more spots in the World Cup finals at the expense of European and South American teams. However, FIFA general secretary Jérôme Valcke said that expansion in 2018 would be "unlikely", while Russian sports minister Vitaly Mutko said that the country was "preparing on the basis that 32 teams will be taking part." Expansion was ultimately delayed until 10 January 2017, when the FIFA Council voted unanimously to expand to 48 teams starting in the 2026 FIFA World Cup.

Summary of qualification
While all FIFA members entered the tournament, not all competed. Zimbabwe were expelled from the competition on 12 March 2015 for their failure to pay former coach José Claudinei a severance fee and Indonesia were excluded from the qualifying competition following the suspension of their football association by FIFA on 30 May 2015. Kuwait had a number of their qualifiers cancelled for a similar suspension that began while their campaign was underway, which eventually resulted in their elimination. Brazil were the first team to achieve qualification for the tournament following their 3–0 victory over Paraguay and Uruguay's loss to Peru on 28 March 2017. Peru became the 32nd and final team to qualify when, 233 days after Brazil secured their place, they beat New Zealand 2–0 on aggregate in the OFC-CONMEBOL play-off.

Note: One team each from AFC, CONCACAF, CONMEBOL, and OFC played in the inter-confederation play-offs, between 10–15 November 2017 (CONCACAF v AFC and OFC v CONMEBOL).

Note: UEFA total includes +1 for Russia as hosts.

Format
The formats of the qualifying competitions depended on each confederation (see below). Each round might be played in either of the following formats:
League format, where more than two teams formed groups to play home-and-away round-robin matches, or in exceptions permitted by the FIFA Organizing Committee, single round-robin matches hosted by one of the participating teams or on neutral territory.
Knockout format, where two teams played home-and-away two-legged matches.

Tiebreakers
In league format, the ranking of teams in each group is based on the following criteria (regulations Articles 20.6 and 20.7):
 Points (3 points for a win, 1 point for a draw, 0 points for a loss)
 Overall goal difference
 Overall goals scored
 Points in matches between tied teams
 Goal difference in matches between tied teams
 Goals scored in matches between tied teams
 Away goals scored in matches between tied teams (if the tie is only between two teams in home-and-away league format)
 Fair play points
 first yellow card: minus 1 point
 indirect red card (second yellow card): minus 3 points
 direct red card: minus 4 points
 yellow card and direct red card: minus 5 points
 Drawing of lots by the FIFA Organising Committee

In cases where teams finishing in the same position across different groups are compared for determining which teams advance to the next stage, the criteria are decided by the confederation and require the approval of FIFA (regulations Article 20.8).

In knockout format, the team that has the higher aggregate score over the two legs progresses to the next round. In the event that aggregate scores finish level, the away goals rule is applied, i.e. the team that scored more goals away from home over the two legs progresses. If away goals are also equal, then thirty minutes of extra time are played, divided into two fifteen-minutes halves. The away goals rule is again applied after extra time, i.e. if there are goals scored during extra time and the aggregate score is still level, the visiting team qualifies by virtue of more away goals scored. If no goals are scored during extra time, the tie is decided by penalty shoot-out (regulations Article 20.9).

Confederation qualification

AFC

The AFC Executive Committee meeting on 16 April 2014 approved the proposal to merge the preliminary qualification rounds of the FIFA World Cup and the AFC Asian Cup, which was expanded to 24 teams starting in 2019:
First round: 12 teams (ranked 35–46) played home-and-away over two legs. The six winners advanced to the second round.
Second round: 40 teams (teams ranked 1–34 and six first round winners) were divided into eight groups of five teams to play home-and-away round-robin matches. The eight group winners and the four best group runners-up advanced to the third round of FIFA World Cup qualification as well as qualified for the 2019 AFC Asian Cup finals.
Third round: 12 teams (an increase from 10 for 2014) which had advanced from the second round were divided into two groups of six teams to play home-and-away round-robin matches. The top two teams of each group qualified for the 2018 FIFA World Cup, and the two third-placed teams advanced to the fourth round.
Fourth round: Two third-placed teams of each third round group played home-and-away over two legs. The winners advanced to the inter-confederation play-offs.

Final positions (third round)

The draw for the third round was held on 12 April 2016 at the Mandarin Oriental Hotel in Kuala Lumpur, Malaysia.

Fourth round

The third-placed teams from each group in the third round played against each other home-and-away over two legs to determine which team advanced to the inter-confederation play-offs.

CAF

The CAF Executive Committee approved the format for the qualifiers of the 2018 FIFA World Cup on 14 January 2015. However, on 9 July 2015 FIFA officially announced that only three rounds would be played instead of four.
First round: 26 teams (ranked 28–53) played home-and-away over two legs. The 13 winners advanced to the second round.
Second round: 40 teams (teams ranked 1–27 and 13 first round winners) played home-and-away over two legs. The 20 winners advanced to the third round.
Third round: 20 teams which had advanced from the second round were divided into five groups of four teams to play home-and-away round-robin matches. The winners of each group qualified for the 2018 FIFA World Cup.

Zimbabwe, even though they entered the competition, were expelled on 12 March 2015 for their failure to pay former coach José Claudinei a severance fee. Therefore, only 53 African teams were involved in the draw.

Final positions (third round)

The draw for the third round was held on 24 June 2016 at the CAF headquarters in Cairo, Egypt.

CONCACAF

An amendment to the qualification process for this tournament had been suggested, which would see the first three rounds played as knockout rounds, with both the fourth round and the final round (referred to as 'The Hex') played as group stages. The first round would be played during the FIFA international dates of 23–31 March 2015. CONCACAF announced the full details on 12 January 2015:
First round: 14 teams (teams ranked 22–35) played home-and-away over two legs. The seven winners advanced to the second round.
Second round: 20 teams (teams ranked 9–21 and seven first round winners) played home-and-away over two legs. The ten winners advanced to the third round.
Third round: 12 teams (teams ranked 7–8 and ten second round winners) played home-and-away over two legs. The six winners advanced to the fourth round.
Fourth round: 12 teams (teams ranked 1–6 and six third round winners) were divided into three groups of four teams to play home-and-away round-robin matches. The top two teams of each group advanced to the fifth round.
Fifth round: Six teams which had advanced from the fourth round played home-and-away round-robin matches in one single group. The top three teams qualified for the 2018 FIFA World Cup, and the fourth-placed team advanced to the inter-confederation play-offs.

Final positions (fifth round)

The draw for the fifth round (to decide the fixtures) was held on 8 July 2016 at the CONCACAF headquarters in Miami Beach, United States.

CONMEBOL

The qualification structure was the same as the previous five editions. The ten teams played in a league of home-and-away round-robin matches. The top four teams qualified for the 2018 FIFA World Cup, and the fifth-placed team advanced to the inter-confederation play-offs.

Unlike previous qualifying tournaments where the fixtures were pre-determined, the fixtures were decided by a draw held on 25 July 2015, at the Konstantinovsky Palace in Strelna, Saint Petersburg, Russia.

Final positions

OFC

The qualification structure was as follows:
First round: Four teams (American Samoa, Cook Islands, Samoa, and Tonga) played a round-robin tournament at a single country. The winners advanced to the second round.
Second round (2016 OFC Nations Cup): Eight teams (Fiji, New Caledonia, New Zealand, Papua New Guinea, Solomon Islands, Tahiti, Vanuatu, and the first round winner) played the tournament at a single country. For the group stage, they were divided into two groups of four teams. The top three teams of each group advanced to the third round.
Third round: Six teams which had advanced from the second round were divided into two groups of three teams to play home-and-away round-robin matches. The two group winners met in a two-legged match with the winners advancing to the inter-confederation play-offs.

The OFC had considered different proposals of the qualifying tournament. A previous proposal adopted by the OFC in October 2014 would have the eight teams divided into two groups of four teams to play home-and-away round-robin matches in the second round, followed by the top two teams of each group advancing to the third round to play in a single group of home-and-away round-robin matches to decide the winners of the 2016 OFC Nations Cup which would qualify to the 2017 FIFA Confederations Cup and advance to the inter-confederation play-offs. However, it was later reported in April 2015 that the OFC had reversed its decision, and the 2016 OFC Nations Cup was played as a one-off tournament similar to the 2012 OFC Nations Cup.

Final positions (third round)

The draw for the third round was held on 8 July 2016 at the OFC headquarters in Auckland, New Zealand.

Final
The draw for the final (which decided the order of legs) was held on 15 June 2017 at the OFC headquarters in Auckland, New Zealand. The winners of the final advanced to inter-confederation play-offs.

UEFA

Russia qualified automatically as hosts. The qualifying format for the remaining FIFA-affiliated UEFA teams was confirmed by the UEFA Executive Committee meeting on 22–23 March 2015 in Vienna.
First round (group stage): 52 UEFA teams affiliated with FIFA at the time of the draw were divided into nine groups (seven groups of six teams and two groups of five teams) to play home-and-away round-robin matches. The winners of each group qualified for the 2018 FIFA World Cup, and the eight best runners-up advanced to the second round (play-offs). With the admission of Gibraltar and Kosovo as FIFA members in May 2016, both national teams were eligible to make their debuts in World Cup qualifying. With initially two groups in the first round having only five teams, Kosovo was assigned to Group I as it was decided that Bosnia and Herzegovina and Serbia should not play against Kosovo for security reasons, and Gibraltar was then added to Group H, so that each of the nine groups then had six teams.
Second round (play-offs): Eight best runners-up from the first round played one other team over two legs, home and away. The four winners qualified for the 2018 FIFA World Cup. In deciding the eight best runners-up, the matches against the sixth-placed team in each group were discarded.

Final positions (first round)
The draw for the first round was held on 25 July 2015, at the Konstantinovsky Palace in Strelna, Saint Petersburg, Russia.

Ranking of runners-up

Second round

The draw for the second round (play-offs) was held on 17 October 2017 at the FIFA headquarters in Zürich, Switzerland. The winners of each tie qualified for the World Cup.

Inter-confederation play-offs

There were two inter-confederation playoffs to determine the final two qualification spots for the finals. The first legs were played on 10 and 11 November 2017, and the second legs were played on 15 November 2017.

The matchups were decided at the preliminary draw which was held on 25 July 2015, at the Konstantinovsky Palace in Strelna, Saint Petersburg, Russia.

CONCACAF v AFC

OFC v CONMEBOL

Top goalscorers

For each confederation and inter-confederation play-offs, see sections in each article:
AFC
CAF
CONCACAF
CONMEBOL
OFC
UEFA
Inter-confederation play-offs

Notes

References

External links

Qualifiers, FIFA.com

 
Qualification
FIFA World Cup qualification